The 1951–52 Nationalliga A season was the 14th season of the Nationalliga A, the top level of ice hockey in Switzerland. Eight teams participated in the league, and EHC Arosa won the championship.

First round

Group 1

Group 2

Final round

5th-8th place

Relegation 
 HC Davos - HC La Chaux-de-Fonds 13:3

External links
 Championnat de Suisse 1951/52

National League (ice hockey) seasons
Swiss
1951–52 in Swiss ice hockey